Magdalena Bartoș (born 23 July 1954) is a Romanian fencer. She competed in the women's individual and team foil events at the 1976 Summer Olympics.

References

1954 births
Living people
Romanian female fencers
Olympic fencers of Romania
Fencers at the 1976 Summer Olympics
Sportspeople from Bucharest
Romanian foil fencers